Wrath of Gods is a 2006 documentary film directed by Jon Gustafsson. It tells the story of the dramatic circumstances Canadian director Sturla Gunnarsson and his crew had to go through during the making of the film Beowulf & Grendel. The main focus of the documentary is on director Sturla Gunnarsson, but other participants are Gerard Butler, Paul Stephens, Eric Jordan, Stellan Skarsgård, Peder Pedrero, Wendy Ord and Sarah Polley. The director of Wrath of Gods, Jon Gustafsson, was hired to play one of Beowulf's warriors and he is credited in Beowulf & Grendel as Geat Warrior #2, Gerard Butler and Martin Delaney co-produced the film. The music was composed by Hilmar Örn Hilmarsson.

Cast
 Gerard Butler
 Sturla Gunnarsson
 Wendy Ord
 Paul Stephens
 Eric Jordan
 Martin Delaney
 Michael Cowan
 Stellan Skarsgård
 Sarah Polley
 Ingvar Sigurdsson
 Tony Curran
 Jon Gustafsson

Awards
 Audience Award - Best Documentary Feature - Oxford International Film Festival 2007
 Jury Award - Achievement in Filmmaking - Stony Brook Film Festival 2007
 Best Documentary Feature shot in digital - Napa Sonoma WineCountry Film Festival 2007
 Bronze Remi Award - film & video production - Entertainment WorldFest 2007
 Premio Especial do Juri - MOFF - Santarém, Portugal 2007
 Grand Jury Prize - Red Rock Film Festival, Utah 2007

Festivals
 Oxford International Film Festival
 RiverRun International Film Festival
 Reykjavik International Film Festival
 Waterfront Film Festival
 Stony Brook Film Festival
 Napa Sonoma WineCountry Film Festival
 Revelation Perth International Film Festival
 NSI Film Exchange Canadian Film Festival
 MOFF - Santarém, Portugal
 Docudays, Beirut, Lebanon
 Fort Lauderdale International Film Festival
 Red Rock Film Festival

External links
 
 

2006 films
Canadian documentary films
Icelandic documentary films
English-language Canadian films
Documentary films about films
2006 documentary films
Films scored by Hilmar Örn Hilmarsson
English-language Icelandic films
2000s English-language films
2000s Canadian films
English-language documentary films